Banny may refer to:

People
Banny deBrum (1956–2011), ambassador of the Republic of the Marshall Islands to the United States
Charles Konan Banny, former Prime Minister of Côte d'Ivoire
Jean Konan Banny, Ivorian politician

Places
Additionally, Banny (masculine), Bannaya (feminine), or Bannoye (neuter) may refer to:

Bannoye, until 1938, name of Sviatohirsk, a town in Donetsk Oblast, Ukraine
Banny, Russia (Bannoye), several rural localities in Russia
Lake Bannoye, a lake in the Republic of Bashkortostan, Russia

See also
Bani (disambiguation)